Toivo Henrik Kinnunen (9 November 1905, in Pieksämäen maalaiskunta – 13 February 1977) was a Finnish farmer and politician. He was a member of the Parliament of Finland from 1945 to 1958 and again from 1962 to 1966, representing the Agrarian League (which changed its name to Centre Party in 1965).

References

1905 births
1977 deaths
People from Pieksämäki
People from Mikkeli Province (Grand Duchy of Finland)
Centre Party (Finland) politicians
Members of the Parliament of Finland (1945–48)
Members of the Parliament of Finland (1948–51)
Members of the Parliament of Finland (1951–54)
Members of the Parliament of Finland (1954–58)
Members of the Parliament of Finland (1962–66)
Finnish people of World War II